The  was held in 2011 in Yokohama, Kanagawa, Japan.

Awards
 Best Film: 13 Assassins
 Best Director: Takashi Miike - 13 Assassins and Zebraman 2: Attack on Zebra City
 Best New Director: 
 Yuya Ishii - Sawako Decides and Kimi to Arukō
 Masaaki Taniguchi - Time Traveller: The Girl Who Leapt Through Time
 Best Screenplay: Daisuke Tengan - 13 Assassins
 Best Cinematographer: Jun Fukumoto - Kondo wa Aisaika and Parade
 Best Actor: Etsushi Toyokawa - Kondo wa Aisaika and Sword of Desperation
 Best Actress: Hikari Mitsushima - Sawako Decides and Kakera: A Piece of Our Life
 Best Supporting Actor: Renji Ishibashi - Kondo wa Aisaika, Parade, Strangers in the City, Outrage and Fallen Angel
 Best Supporting Actress: Yui Natsukawa - Kokō no Mesu
 Best Newcomer: 
 Osamu Mukai - BECK and Hanamizuki
 Hiroko Sato - A Night in Nude: Salvation
 Special Grand Prize: Hiroki Matsukata

Best 10
 13 Assassins
 Confessions
 Villain
 Sawako Decides
 Kondo wa Aisaika
 Sword of Desperation
 Kokō no Mesu
 A Night in Nude: Salvation
 Permanent Nobara
 Time Traveller: The Girl Who Leapt Through Time
runner-up: Haru's Journey

References

Yokohama Film Festival
Yokohama Film Festival
Yokohama Film Festival
2011 in Japanese cinema